The Angola cave chat (Xenocopsychus ansorgei) is a small passerine bird in the Old World flycatcher family Muscicapidae. It is the sole member of the monotypic genus Xenocopsychus; although it was placed in Cossypha between 2010 and 2022 based on the results of a 2010 molecular phylogenetic study, this placement was found to be an error. It occurs locally from western Angola to marginally south of the Kunene River in northern Namibia. Its natural habitat is rocky places in moist to dry savanna. It was previously described as being Near threatened, but has since been downgraded to Least concerned.

References

Angolan cave chat
Angolan cave chat
Taxonomy articles created by Polbot
Taxobox binomials not recognized by IUCN